Abraham Baldwin Agricultural College (ABAC) is a public college in Tifton, Georgia. It is part of the University System of Georgia and offers baccalaureate and associate degrees. The college is named after Abraham Baldwin, a signer of the United States Constitution from Georgia and the first president of the University of Georgia.

ABAC was established in 1908 as the Second District A&M School.  The name was changed to the South Georgia A&M College in 1924, and to the Georgia State College for Men in 1929.  It became Abraham Baldwin Agricultural College in 1933 when ABAC became a part of the newly formed University System of Georgia. At that time, ABAC's mission was devoted to associate level studies in agriculture, home economics, and related fields.  Today, ABAC offers a variety of bachelor's degree programs as well as associate degrees.

Campus
The ABAC campus is used as an open-air classroom for students in the School of Agriculture and Natural Resources due to the large number of trees, plants, shrubs, and fields on campus. ABAC faculty, staff, students and visitors also enjoy the well-manicured grounds of the college. A renovation project was recently completed for the original three buildings on campus, Tift, Lewis, and Herring Halls.  New landscaping and a new front lawn for ABAC were also a part of the renovation process. ABAC has a lab science building that was opened in 2016. ABAC also has a satellite campus in Bainbridge.

The college became the owner of Possum Poke in 1999.

Academics
The School of Agriculture and Natural Resources is the largest area of study at ABAC. The Forestry track of the Natural Resources Management program is accredited by the Society of American Foresters. Nursing is the largest single major. This associate degree program prepares students to be certified as a Registered Nurse (R.N.).

Learning laboratories such as the J.G. Woodroof Farm and the Forest Lakes Golf Club enhance the academic curriculum.  ABAC's 516-acre campus also includes the Georgia Museum of Agriculture and Historic Village, located one mile south of the main campus.  Key components of the museum include an 1890s village, a blacksmith shop, a grist mill, a cotton gin, a print shop, a saw mill, and a steam locomotive.

Student life

There are numerous student organizations on the ABAC campus. Students have the opportunity to get involved with organizations ranging from the Student Government Association to the Forestry-Wildlife Club.

Campus media
The Stallion is the premier student newspaper in both the state and the southeast region. It wins annual awards for excellence in all categories, such as editorials, feature writing, photography, layout and design, given by the Georgia Press Association. Staff of the literary magazine, Pegasus, and creative writing faculty sponsor numerous poetry readings each year. Other events include a Writer's Harvest and contributions to the George Scott Day festival.

ABAC also has its own radio station, WPLH 103.1.

Athletics, music, and clubs
Intercollegiate sports teams include baseball, golf, and tennis for men, and softball, tennis, and soccer for women. ABAC has five national championships, three in softball and two in men's tennis.

ABAC has achieved international attention through its music program. The music program at ABAC includes a jazz band, jazz choir, concert band, concert choir, bluegrass band, and pep band. The ABAC jazz band has been on three tours of Europe. ABAC vocalists performed in 2011 at Lincoln Center.

The ABAC Arts Connection brings art and cultural events to Tifton and surrounding counties. The Baldwin Players theatre troupe stage performances during the fall and spring semesters. Recently, ABAC became a member institution of the Georgia Poetry Circuit.

ABAC has a Greek system on campus with the Sigma Alpha, Lambda Sigma Upsilon, Alpha Gamma Rho and Kappa Sigma fraternities.

One of the more active clubs on campus is the Agricultural Engineering Technology Club. It is known for holding truck and tractor pulls on campus each fall and spring. The club maintains the ABAC Crackerjack pulling tractor, an Allis Chalmers 190XT, built in the 1970s by former staff member Jimmy Grubbs. The AET club has also recently completed work on a new pulling tractor, an AGCO Allis 9650, making the ABAC AET club the only college organization in the U.S. that currently has two running and competitive Super Farm pulling tractors. Almost all of the work building the new tractor and the work needed to maintain Crackerjack is performed by the students in the club. The club uses both tractors as recruiting tools not only for the organization, but for the school as well.

Housing

Over 1,200 students live on the ABAC campus in modern housing units. In ABAC Place, every student has a private bedroom in a four-bedroom, two-bath apartment. The ABAC Lakeside facility offers suite-style living for freshmen on the north shore of Lake Baldwin.

Notable alumni
 Fred Bond, Jr., tobacco industry representative and politician
 Ralph Bryant, former major league baseball player who played with the Los Angeles Dodgers
 Tom Cheney, struck out the highest number of batters in a single Major League Baseball game playing for the Washington Senators
 Cathy Cox, former Secretary of State of Georgia
 Harris DeVane, stock car racing driver
 Kyle Farnsworth, former journeyman relief pitcher.
 George Thornewell Smith, only person to win contested elections in all three branches of the state of Georgia government; former lieutenant governor
 Boo Weekley, professional golfer who plays on the PGA Tour
Harold Bascom Durham Jr. received Medal of Honor for his actions in Vietnam.

References

External links
 

Public universities and colleges in Georgia (U.S. state)
Agricultural universities and colleges in the United States
Educational institutions established in 1908
Universities and colleges accredited by the Southern Association of Colleges and Schools
Education in Tift County, Georgia
Buildings and structures in Tift County, Georgia
Forestry education
1908 establishments in Georgia (U.S. state)
NJCAA athletics
University System of Georgia